Nigeria competed at the 2012 Summer Olympics in London, from 27 July to 12 August 2012.  This was the nation's fifteenth appearance at the Olympics.  Nigeria missed the 1976 Summer Olympics in Montreal because of the African boycott.  The Nigerian Olympic Committee sent the nation's smallest delegation to the Games since 1984. A total of 53 athletes, 30 men and 23 women, competed in 8 sports. Men's basketball was the only team-based sport in which Nigeria was represented at these Olympic Games. Among the eight sports played by the athletes, Nigeria marked its official Olympic debut in slalom canoeing.

The Nigerian team featured two Olympic medalists from Beijing: taekwondo jin Chika Chukwumerije, who served as the nation's team captain, and long jumper Blessing Okagbare. Table tennis player Segun Toriola, the oldest member of the team, at age 37, became the first Nigerian athlete to compete in six Olympic games. Toriola's fellow table tennis player Olufunke Oshonaike made her fifth Olympic appearance, making her the nation's oldest and most experienced female athlete. Freestyle wrestler Sinivie Boltic was Nigeria's first male flag bearer at the opening ceremony since 2000.

Nigeria failed to win a single medal for the first time in Olympic history since 1988, after achieving poor athletic performance at these Games. Triple jumper Tosin Oke, the women's sprint relay team (led by Blessing Okagbare), and weightlifter Felix Ekpo qualified successfully for the final rounds of their respective events, but missed out of the medal standings. Following the athletes' lackluster performance, President Goodluck Jonathan "called for a complete overhaul of Nigerian sports administration".  A few weeks after the Olympics, the Nigerian athletes, however, were able to recapture the nation's sporting success at the Paralympics, as they had earned a total of twelve medals, including six golds.

Athletics

Nigerian athletes have so far achieved qualifying standards in the following athletics events (up to a maximum of 3 athletes in each event at the 'A' Standard, and 1 at the 'B' Standard):

Men
Track & road events

Field events

Women
Track & road events

Field events

Combined events – Heptathlon

Basketball

Men's tournament

Roster

Group play

Boxing

Nigeria has so far qualified boxers for the following events

Men

Women

Canoeing

Slalom
Nigeria has qualified boats for the following events

Table tennis

Nigeria has so far qualified two men and two women.

Taekwondo

Nigeria has qualified 2 athletes.

Weightlifting

Nigeria has qualified the following quota places.

Wrestling

Nigeria has qualified the following quota places.

Men's freestyle

Women's freestyle

See also
 Nigeria at the 2012 Summer Paralympics

References

External links

Nations at the 2012 Summer Olympics
2012
2012 in Nigerian sport